Steve "Skinny" Felton is an American musician, most notable for being the co-founder, leader, and drummer of metal band Mushroomhead. He was also the drummer of the bands Hatrix, (216), Tenafly Viper and Scelestus. His other projects include Detroit Ave and 10,000 Cadillacs with fellow Mushroomhead member Jason "J Mann" Popson. He has produced every Mushroomhead album and has directed most of their music videos.

Equipment 
Drums- Tama Artstar Custom, Titanium Silver finish, Black hardware
8"×8" Tom
12"×10 Tom
10"×9" Tom
18"×16" Floor Tom
22"×18" Bass drum (×2)
14"×5.5" Starclassic Maple Snare
Cymbals – Zildjian

18" A China High

14" A Mastersound HiHats

18" A Heavy Crash

17" A Heavy Crash

12" Oriental China "Trash"

9" ZIL-BEL

10" A Splash

17" A Heavy Crash

18" A Heavy Crash

21" A Mega Bell Ride

12" A Custom Mastersound HiHats

18" A China High

Drumheads
Toms – Evans hydraulic black
Bass – Evans EMAD2 clear
Snare – Evans G2 coated
Hardware – Tama
IronCobra Power-Glide single pedal (×2)
IronCobra Lever-Glide hi-hat stand
Power Tower Rack System
1st Chair Ergo-Rider drum throne
Other
Pro-Mark drum sticks
ddrum Pro Acoustic bass drum triggers

References 

Living people
American heavy metal drummers
American industrial musicians
Musicians from Ohio
American rock drummers
Nu metal drummers
20th-century American drummers
American male drummers
20th-century American male musicians
1969 births